Lebyodki is a village in Dolzhansky District of Oryol Oblast, Russia.

References

Rural localities in Oryol Oblast
Livensky Uyezd (Oryol Governorate)